The Ballade Stakes is a Canadian Thoroughbred horse race run annually at Woodbine Racetrack in Toronto, Ontario. An Ontario Sire Stakes, it is a restricted race for Fillies and Mares, three-years-old and up.

Normally run in mid June, it is raced over a distance of 6 furlongs on Polytrack.

Records
Speed  record: 
 1:09.08 - Brass In Pocket (2004)

Most wins:
 2 - Barlee Mist (1999, 2000)
 2 - Mysterious Affair (2001, 2002)
 2 - Brass In Pocket (2003, 2004)

Most wins by an owner:
 2 - Barlee Farm (1999, 2000)
 2 - J. Mort Hardy (2001, 2002)
 3 - Frank Di Giulio, Jr. (2003, 2004 & 2012)

Most wins by a jockey:
 3 - Richard Dos Ramos (1998, 2001, 2002)

Most wins by a trainer:
 3 - Robert P. Tiller (2003, 2004, 2012)

Winners of the Ballade Stakes

References
 The Ballade Stakes at Pedigree Query
 Woodbine Racetrack

Ontario Sire Stakes
Ungraded stakes races in Canada
Sprint category horse races for fillies and mares
Recurring sporting events established in 1997
Woodbine Racetrack